The 1997 Winnipeg Blue Bombers finished in 3rd place in the East Division with a 4–14 record and failed to make the playoffs. This ended the second longest playoff streak in CFL history at 17 years (1980–1996).

Offseason

CFL Draft

Ottawa Rough Riders Dispersal Draft

Regular season

Season standings

Season schedule

Awards and records

1997 CFL All-Stars
WR – Milt Stegall, CFL All-Star
ST – Shonte Peoples, CFL All-Star

References

Winnipeg Blue Bombers seasons
Winn